Roar Flåthen (born 15 January 1950) is a Norwegian trade unionist and politician for the Norwegian Labour Party.

He was leader of the Norwegian Confederation of Trade Unions 2007 - 2013. He became the leader after Gerd-Liv Valla resigned on 9 March 2007 in the aftermath of the Valla scandal.

He has also represented the trade union in the National Wages Board, before becoming the trade union's leader.

As a politician he served as a deputy representative to the Parliament of Norway from Buskerud during the term 1985–1989.

As of 2014 he is a board member of Kongsberg Gruppen.

References

1950 births
Living people
Labour Party (Norway) politicians
Norwegian trade unionists
Deputy members of the Storting